Giovanni Battista Canziani (1664–1730) was an Italian painter of the Baroque style.
Born in Verona and died in Rome. He studied with Andrea Voltolino and Giambettino Cignaroli in Verona. Guilty of murder, he fled from Verona to Bologna, and then to Rome where he was best known as a portraitist.

References

1664 births
1730 deaths
17th-century Italian painters
Italian male painters
18th-century Italian painters
Italian Baroque painters
Painters from Verona
18th-century Italian male artists